The mole toadlet (Uperoleia talpa) is a species of frog in the family Myobatrachidae.
It is endemic to Western Australia.
Its natural habitats are dry savanna and subtropical or tropical dry lowland grassland.

Its closest relative is thought to be the Pilbara toadlet (Uperoleia saxatilis), described in 2011.

Footnotes

References

Uperoleia
Amphibians of Western Australia
Taxonomy articles created by Polbot
Amphibians described in 1981
Frogs of Australia